Morongla Creek is a stream near Mount Morris and Slatterys Hill and runs in a generally northward direction for about 30 km before joining the Lachlan River. It passes the town of Morongla Creek, New South Wales, east of Lachlan Valley Way  B81.

See also

 List of rivers of New South Wales (L-Z)
 Rivers of New South Wales

References

Rivers of New South Wales
Tributaries of the Lachlan River